Countess Armgard of Rietberg (also: Irmgard; died 13 July 1584) was from 1562 to 1584 Countess of Rietberg in her own right.  She was also Countess of Hoya by marriage from 1568 to 1575 and Countess of Lippe by marriage from 1578 until her death.

Armgard was the elder of two daughters of John II and Agnes of Bentheim-Steinfurt. Armgard married on 3 January 1568 Count Eric V of Hoya.  He died on 12 March 1575.  Armgard then married on 26 June 1578 Count Simon VI of Lippe.

Her father died on 11 December 1562.  Because she had no brothers, Armgard and her sister Walburgis inherited his possessions.  Because they were minors, their mother acted as guardian and Regent.  On 27 September 1576, Armgard and Walburgis divided their inheritance: Armgard received Rietberg; Walburgis received the Harlingerland.

Armgard died childless on 13 July 1584 and the County of Rietberg fell to her sister Walburgis, so that the County of Rietberg and Harlingerland were reunited in one hand.

References and sources

Footnotes 

1584 deaths
House of Lippe
Countesses of Rietberg
Year of birth unknown